Pelah Kabud (also Romanized as Pelah Kabūd and Pelleh Kabūd; also known as Pelah Kabūd-e Soflá) is a village in Helilan Rural District, Helilan District, Chardavol County, Ilam Province, Iran. At the 2006 census, its population was 465, in 91 families. The village is populated by Kurds.

References 

Populated places in Chardavol County
Kurdish settlements in Ilam Province